Adam Richman's Best Sandwich in America is an American food reality television series that premiered on June 6, 2012 on the Travel Channel. The program is hosted by actor and food enthusiast Adam Richman. In each episode, Richman samples what he considers to be the best sandwiches across the country, chooses a regional favorite, and then pits the winners against each other to find the nation's No. 1 sandwich.

Premise
Adam Richman's Best Sandwich in America features "one man's quest"—Adam Richman—to find the best thing since "sliced bread on sliced bread". Richman will sample the three most mouthwatering sandwiches in different regions across the United States, evaluate each one with his "B.I.T.E. Scale" (Bread, Interior, Taste, and Eating Experience) and then crown one sandwich "supreme". Each episode ends with Richman adding a send-off of the regional favorite sandwiches that got left behind. The weekly series featured eleven episodes (ten half-hour episodes with a one-hour finale).

Opening
The show opens with the following quote:

Celebrities
Every episode (save the Mid-Atlantic episode) starts off with a celebrity recommending his or her favorite sandwich in a different region. 
 Kevin Pollak - Film actor/comedian (favorite sandwich in Northeast: Primanti Bros. stuffed sandwiches) 
 Anthony Bourdain - Chef/food traveler (favorite sandwich in Gulf Coast: Domilise's shrimp po'boy)
 Will Hoge - Rising country music star (favorite sandwich in South: Mitchell Delicatessen Asian flank-steak sandwich)
 Curtis Granderson - Professional baseball player (favorite sandwich in Midwest: Fifty/50 "4-Courser" sandwich)
 Mario Batali - Celebrity chef (favorite sandwich in Northwest: Salumi braised oxtail sandwich)
 Jay Baruchel - Film actor (favorite sandwich in West Coast: JR's Barbeque pulled pork sandwich)
 Andrew Zimmern - Food traveler (favorite sandwich in Great Lakes: Tilia Fish Taco Torta)
 Bobby Flay - Celebrity chef (favorite sandwich in Southwest: The Salt Lick brisket jalapeño sandwich)
 Samantha Brown - Adventurer/traveler (favorite sandwich in New England:  Jumpin' Jay's Fish Cafe crab-filled grilled cheese sandwich)
 G. Love - Rock musician (national championship wild card #1: John's Roast Pork cheesesteak)

Episodes

Brackets

Northeast

Gulf Coast

South

Midwest

Mid-Atlantic

Northwest

West Coast

Great Lakes

Southwest

New England

Championship finale

References

External links
Adam Richman's Best Sandwich of America official website

2012 American television series debuts
2012 American television series endings
English-language television shows
Food travelogue television series
Food reality television series
Travel Channel original programming